José Meiffret (1913–1983, born Boulouris, France) was a cyclist who set a world motor-paced speed record of 204.73 km/h (127.243 mi/h) behind a Mercedes-Benz 300SL on the German Autobahn on July 19, 1962 at Freiburg Germany.  This record was set on a bicycle setup with a 130-tooth chainring, weighing 20 kg and equipped with wooden rims.

See also 
Cycling records

References

Bibliography 
 Meiffret, José. (1965). Mes Rendez-vous avec la Mort. Flammarion.

External links
A synopsis of José's world record ride
A picture of the bike used for the record, now in a Parisean Museum
Motor-Paced Cycle Speed Attempt Ends – Disaster 1952

1913 births
1988 deaths
French male cyclists
People from Saint-Raphaël, Var
Sportspeople from Var (department)
Cyclists from Provence-Alpes-Côte d'Azur